Kodathur is one of the 4 Firkas of Villianur taluk in Pondicherry (North) Revenue Sub-division of the Indian union territory of Puducherry.

Revenue villages
The following are the revenue villages under Kodathur Firka

 Katery
 Kodathur
 Kuppam
 Pudukuppam
 Sellipet
 Sorapet
 Suthukeny
 Thethampakkam
 Vambupet

See also
Mannadipet firka
Thondamanatham firka
Villianur firka

References

External links
 Department of Revenue and Disaster Management, Government of Puducherry

Geography of Puducherry
Puducherry district